The 2004–05 Australian Athletics Championships was the 83rd edition of the national championship in outdoor track and field for Australia. It was held from 4–6 March 2005 at the Sydney Olympic Park Athletic Centre in Sydney. It served as a selection meeting for Australia at the 2005 World Championships in Athletics. The 10,000 metres event took place separately at the Zatopek 10K on 4 December 2004 at Lakeside Stadium in Melbourne. Relay events were contested in Canberra on 6 February 2005.

Medal summary

Men

Women

References

External links 
 Athletics Australia website

2005
Australian Athletics Championships
Australian Championships
Athletics Championships
Sports competitions in Sydney
2000s in Sydney